The following chart lists countries and dependencies along with their capital cities, in English and non-English official language(s).

 In bold: internationally recognized sovereign states
 The 193 member states of the United Nations (UN)
 Vatican City (administered by the Holy See, a UN observer state), which is generally recognized as a sovereign state
 In bold italics: states with limited recognition and associated states not members of the United Nations
 De facto sovereign states with partial international recognition, such as the State of Palestine, the Republic of Kosovo and Taiwan
 De facto sovereign states lacking general international recognition
 Cook Islands and Niue, two associated states of New Zealand without UN membership
 In italics: non-sovereign territories that are recognized by the UN as part of some member state
 Dependent territories
 Special territories recognized by international treaty (such as the special administrative regions of China)
 Other territories often regarded as separate geographical territories even though they are integral parts of their mother countries (such as the overseas departments of France)

A

B

C

D

E

F

G

H

I

J

K

L

M

N

O

P

Q

R

S

T

U

V

W

Y

Z

Notes

References

Native
Exonyms
Lists of capitals